Lai-Hka Township, also known as  Legya Township, is the former capital of Laihka State, one of the former southern Shan States. The city has a population of over 60,000. In the south, it connects Panglong and Lui Lin. Its neighboring towns are Lokjok to the west and Merng Klueng to the north. The rural part of the township is divided into four quarters. Agriculture is the main industry in Lai-Hka.

History
Lai-Hka Township has had a turbulent and unstable history, with conflicts between the Shan State Army-South (SSA-S) and the Burmese Army. In the first half of 2009, there were at least four battles every month and the SPDC retaliated against villagers by confiscating property, extortion and forced relocation. 

At the end of July 2009, more than five hundred houses were burnt and 30 villages forcibly relocated in the township of Lai-Hka.

References

External links

Townships of Shan State
Loilen District